Collix praetenta is a moth in the  family Geometridae. It is found in the north-eastern Himalayas and Taiwan.

References

Moths described in 1929
praetenta